The Sabail FK 2022–23 season is Sabail's sixth Azerbaijan Premier League season, and their seventh season in existence. They will compete in the Premier League and the Azerbaijan Cup.

Season events
Prior to the start of the season Head Coach Aftandil Hacıyev left by mutual agreement, with Mahmud Qurbanov being appointed as his replacement.

On 28 December, Mahmud Qurbanov resigned as Head Coach. The following day, 29 December, Shahin Diniyev was appointed as Sabail new Head Coach.

On 15 February, Ilkin Muradov joined Sabail on loan from Zira for the remainder of the season.

Squad

Transfers

In

Loans in

Out

Loans out

Released

Friendlies

Competitions

Overview

Premier League

Results summary

Results by round

Results

League table

Azerbaijan Cup

Squad statistics

Appearances and goals

|-
|colspan="14"|Players away on loan:
|-
|colspan="14"|Players who left Sabail during the season:

|}

Goal scorers

Clean sheets

Disciplinary record

References

Sabail FK
Azerbaijani football clubs 2022–23 season